The Art of Losing may refer to:
 The Art of Losing (American Hi-Fi album), 2003
 The Art of Losing (The Anchoress album), 2021
 The Art of Losing (song), a song by American Hi-Fi
 The Art of Losing, a novel by French author Alice Zeniter